The 1977 Rudé Právo Cup was the first edition of the Rudé Právo Cup ice hockey tournament. Three teams participated in the tournament, which was won by the Soviet Union.

Tournament

Results

Final standings

References

External links
Tournament on hockeyarchives.ru

1977
1977–78 in Soviet ice hockey
1977–78 in Czechoslovak ice hockey
1977–78 in American ice hockey
1977